Cherie R. Kagan (b. 1969, Manhasset, New York) is the Stephen J. Angello Professor of Electrical and Systems Engineering, Professor of Materials Science and Engineering, and Professor of Chemistry at the University of Pennsylvania. Kagan is an Associate Editor of ACS Nano and serves on the editorial boards of Nano Letters and NanoToday.

Research 
Kagan and her group's research interests are in the chemical and physical properties of nanostructured and organic materials and in integrating these materials in electronic, optoelectronic, optical, thermoelectric and bioelectronic devices. The group explores the structure and function of these materials and devices using spatially- and temporally-resolved optical spectroscopies, AC and DC electrical techniques, electrochemistry, scanning probe and electron microscopies and analytical measurements.

Education and academic career 
Kagan graduated from the University of Pennsylvania in 1991 with a BSE in Materials Science and Engineering and a BA Mathematics. She earned her PhD in Materials Science and Engineering from the Massachusetts Institute of Technology in 1996 working with Moungi Bawendi. In 1996, she went to Bell Labs as a postdoctoral fellow. In 1998, Kagan joined IBM’s T. J. Watson Research Center, where she most recently managed the “Molecular Assemblies and Devices Group.” In 2007, she joined the faculty of the University of Pennsylvania.

Kagan is co-director of The Penn Center for Energy Innovation and serves on the World Economic Forum, Global Agenda Council on Nanotechnology; on the U.S. Department of Energy, Basic Energy Sciences Materials Council; and on the advisory board of the US Summer Schools in Condensed Matter and Materials Physics. She served on the Materials Research Society’s Board of Directors from 2007-2009 and the editorial board of the ACS Applied Materials and Interfaces from 2008-2011.

Awards and honors 

 Fellow of the National Academy of Inventors (2021) 
 S. Reid Warren, Jr Award (2015)
 Fellow of the American Physical Society (2013)
 Stanford University’s Distinguished Women in Science Colloquium (2009)
 IBM Outstanding Technical Achievement Award (2005)
 ACS Top 12 Young Women at the Forefront of Chemistry (2002)
 MIT Technology Review TR10 (2000)

References

External links
 

American nanotechnologists
1969 births
People from Manhasset, New York
University of Pennsylvania School of Engineering and Applied Science alumni
University of Pennsylvania staff
Living people
MIT School of Engineering alumni
Fellows of the National Academy of Inventors